Dr. Jaswinder Singh (born 17 May 1954) is an Indian Punjabi novelist.

Books 
Amarīkī Pañjābī kahāṇī : ika punara-mulāṅkana : khoja nibandha	
Amrici Punajbi kahani	 
Bhartiya kavita sanchayan, Punjabi (1950-2010)	 
Ghara dā̄ jīa : kahāṇī saṅgrahi	 
Gurabak̲h̲asha Siṅgha Prītalaṛī dī swaijīwanī	 
Mat-lok	 
Māta loka : nāwala	 
Merā piṇḍa : ālocanātamaka adhiaina	 
Naweṃ kāwi sitāre
Nawīṃ Pañjābī kawitā : pachāṇa cinnha

Awards
Singh won the Sahitya Akademi Award in 2015 for his novel Maat Lok.

See also
List of Sahitya Akademi Award winners for Punjabi

References

1954 births
Living people
Punjabi people
20th-century Indian novelists
Punjabi-language writers
Recipients of the Sahitya Akademi Award in Punjabi
People from Jalandhar
Novelists from Punjab, India